The Boazi languages, also known as the Lake Murray languages, are a pair of languages in the Trans–New Guinea family, spoken near Lake Murray (Papua New Guinea). They were previously classified in the Marind branch.

The languages are Kuni-Boazi and Zimakani.

Phonemes
Usher (2020) reconstructs the consonant inventory as follows:

{| 
| *m || *n ||  || 
|-
| *p || *t ||  || *k 
|-
| [*b] || [*d] || || *g 
|-
| *mb || *nd || || *ŋg 
|-
| *f || *s ||  || 
|-
| *w || || *j || *ɣ 
|}
Vowels are *a *e *i *o *u.

Pronouns
The pronouns are:
{| 
! !!sg!!pl
|-
!1
|*no(k)||*ni(k)
|-
!2
|*ɣo(k)||*jo(k)
|-
!3m
|*e-||rowspan=2|*i-
|-
!3f
|*u-
|}

References

Further reading
Voorhoeve, C.L. "The Languages of the Lake Murray Area". In Voorhoeve, C., McElhanon, K., Blowers, B. and Blowers, R. editors, Papers in New Guinea Linguistics No. 12. A-25:1-18. Pacific Linguistics, The Australian National University, 1970.

External links 
 Timothy Usher, New Guinea World, Proto–Lake Murray

 
Anim languages
Languages of Papua New Guinea